Dartmouth III is a ferry that served the Halifax–Dartmouth route in Nova Scotia from 1978 to 2016.
After the ferry was retired, it was put up for auction, and bought by a Toronto company for service in Toronto.

Specifications

The vessel has two passenger decks, with a small bridge deck above.  She has a capacity of 390 passengers.  She is propelled by Voith Schneider system.

Halifax service

In 1980 fans of the rock and roll band, April Wine, overcrowded the vessel, following a concert.  Passengers described frightening overcrowding, and finding the extra weight made the vessel seem unstable.  During the ten minute trip to Dartmouth the fans caused $20,000 worth of damage.  Service was suspended and those left at the ferry terminal had to walk across the bridge crossing.

Toronto service

After she was put up for auction the ferry was purchased by the Toronto Island Transit Service, for $100,000.  The plans are for the ferry to operate under a charter, beside the ferries owned by the City.

The vessel was sold for $100,000, by a company that runs an amusement park on Toronto's Centre Island.  She started a $500,000 refit, and was expected to begin service in Toronto during the 2018 summer season, but has not been put into service.

References

External links
 

Ferries of Nova Scotia
Ferries of Ontario
1979 ships